Liz Reyer is an American politician serving in the Minnesota House of Representatives since 2021. A member of the Democratic-Farmer-Labor Party (DFL), Reyer represents District 51B in the southern Twin Cities metropolitan area, which includes the cities of Eagan and Burnsville and parts of Dakota County, Minnesota.

Early life, education and career 
Reyer earned a B.A. in Chinese from the University of Minnesota and a M.A. in political science from Ohio State University. She received a graduate certificate in executive coaching in 2003 from Royal Roads University.

In 1994, Reyer joined Blue Cross Blue Shield of Minnesota, working as the director of market research and manager of the process and technology group. From 2010 to 2013, she was the insights and innovation director of Maritz, a market research firm. In 2013, Reyer joined GfK as the company's vice president and key account manager. From 2008-2020, Reyer contributed columns to the Star Tribune business insider section.

Minnesota House of Representatives 
Reyer was elected to the Minnesota House of Representatives in 2020 and was reelected in 2022. She first ran after four-term DFL incumbent Laurie Halverson announced she would not seek reelection, instead running for Dakota County Commissioner. Reyer defeated Eagan mayor Mike Maguire in the DFL primary. After 2022 legislative redistricting put Reyer in the same district as fellow DFLer Ruth Richardson, Reyer moved to Eagan to face seven-term DFL incumbent Sandra Masin, whom Reyer defeated in the primary election.

Reyer serves as vice chair of the Capital Investment Committee, and sits on the Health Finance and Policy, Human Services Finance, and Workforce Development Finance and Policy Committees. 

Reyer proposed legislation that would stop private hospitals from using a state revenue recapture program to collect tax refunds for private hospital debt. She spoke about her concern that a proposed merger between the Fairview and Sanford health systems would lead to hospital closures and higher costs.

Electoral history

References

External links 

 Official House of Representatives website
 Official campaign website

Democratic Party members of the Minnesota House of Representatives
University of Minnesota alumni
Ohio State University alumni
Women state legislators in Minnesota
Living people
Year of birth missing (living people)
21st-century American women